This article lists the presenters, venues and winners for the Brit Awards from 1977, 1982 to the present day, which includes the 1977 Silver Jubilee awards presentation.

2023

Host(s): Mo Gilligan (Main)
Venue: The O2 Arena
Broadcaster: ITV

2022

Host(s): Mo Gilligan (Main); Clara Amfo and Maya Jama (Launch)
Venue: The O2 Arena
Broadcaster: ITV

2021

Host(s): Jack Whitehall (Main); Nick Grimshaw and Griff (Launch)
Venue: The O2 Arena
Broadcaster: ITV
 British Album of the Year: Dua Lipa – Future Nostalgia
 British Single of the Year: Harry Styles – "Watermelon Sugar"
 British Male Solo Artist: J Hus
 British Female Solo Artist: Dua Lipa
 British Group: Little Mix
 British Breakthrough Act: Arlo Parks
 International Male Solo Artist: The Weeknd
 International Female Solo Artist: Billie Eilish
 International Group: HAIM
 Rising Star Award: Griff
Icon Award : Taylor Swift

2020

Host(s): Jack Whitehall (Main); Alice Levine (Launch)
Venue: The O2 Arena
Broadcaster: ITV
 British Album of the Year: Dave – Psychodrama
 Song of the Year: Lewis Capaldi – "Someone You Loved"
 Rising Star Award: Celeste
 British Male Solo Artist: Stormzy
 British Female Solo Artist: Mabel
 British Group: Foals
 Best New Artist: Lewis Capaldi
 International Male Solo Artist: Tyler, the Creator
 International Female Solo Artist: Billie Eilish
 British Producer of the Year: Fred Again

2019

Host(s): Jack Whitehall (Main); Clara Amfo (Launch)
Venue: The O2 Arena
Broadcaster: ITV
 British Album of the Year: The 1975 – A Brief Inquiry into Online Relationships
 British Producer of the Year: Calvin Harris
 British Single of the Year: Calvin Harris and Dua Lipa – "One Kiss"
 British Video of the Year: Little Mix featuring Nicki Minaj – "Woman Like Me"
 British Male Solo Artist: George Ezra
 British Female Solo Artist: Jorja Smith
 British Group: The 1975
 British Breakthrough Act: Tom Walker
 International Male Solo Artist: Drake
 International Female Solo Artist: Ariana Grande
 International Group: The Carters
 Critics' Choice Award: Sam Fender
 Global Success Award: Ed Sheeran
 Outstanding Contribution to Music: Pink

2018

Host(s): Jack Whitehall (Main); Emma Willis (Launch)
Venue: The O2 Arena
Broadcaster: ITV
 British Album of the Year: Stormzy – Gang Signs & Prayer
 British Single of the Year: Rag'n'Bone Man – "Human"
 British Video of the Year: Harry Styles – "Sign Of The Times"
 British Producer of the Year: Steve Mac
 British Breakthrough Act: Dua Lipa
 British Male Solo Artist: Stormzy
 British Female Solo Artist: Dua Lipa
 British Group: Gorillaz
 International Male Solo Artist: Kendrick Lamar
 International Female Solo Artist: Lorde
 International Group: Foo Fighters
 Critics' Choice Award: Jorja Smith
 Global Success Award: Ed Sheeran

2017

Host(s): Dermot O'Leary and Emma Willis (Main); Emma Willis (Launch)
Venue: O2 Arena
Broadcaster: ITV

MasterCard British Album of the Year: David Bowie – Blackstar
British Single of the Year: Little Mix – "Shout Out to My Ex"
British Video: One Direction – "History"
British Breakthrough Act: Rag'n'Bone Man
British Female Solo Artist: Emeli Sandé
British Male Solo Artist: David Bowie
British Group: The 1975
International Female Solo Artist: Beyoncé
International Male Solo Artist: Drake
International Group: A Tribe Called Quest
Critics' Choice: Rag'n'Bone Man
Global Success: Adele
British Icon: Robbie Williams

2016

Host(s): Ant & Dec (Main); Laura Whitmore (Launch)
Venue: O2 Arena
Broadcaster: ITV

MasterCard British Album of the Year: Adele – 25
British Single of the Year: Adele – "Hello"
British Video of the Year: One Direction – "Drag Me Down"
British Breakthrough Act: Catfish and the Bottlemen
British Female Solo Artist: Adele
British Male Solo Artist: James Bay
British Group: Coldplay
British Producer of the Year: Charlie Andrew
International Female Solo Artist: Björk
International Male Solo Artist: Justin Bieber
International Group: Tame Impala
Critics' Choice Award: Jack Garratt
Global Success Award: Adele
Icon Award: David Bowie

2015

Host(s): Ant & Dec (Main); Reggie Yates (Launch)
Venue: O2 Arena
Broadcaster: ITV

MasterCard British Album of the Year: Ed Sheeran – x
British Single of the Year: Mark Ronson feat. Bruno Mars – "Uptown Funk"
British Video of the Year: One Direction – "You & I"
British Breakthrough Act: Sam Smith
British Female Solo Artist: Paloma Faith
British Male Solo Artist: Ed Sheeran
British Group: Royal Blood
British Producer of the Year: Paul Epworth
International Female Solo Artist: Taylor Swift
International Male Solo Artist: Pharrell Williams
International Group: Foo Fighters
Critics' Choice Award: James Bay
Global Success Award: Sam Smith

2014

Host(s): James Corden (Main); Nick Grimshaw (Launch)
Venue: O2 Arena
Broadcaster: ITV

British Album of the Year: Arctic Monkeys – AM
British Producer of the Year: Flood & Alan Moulder
British Single of the Year: Rudimental – "Waiting All Night"
British Video of the Year: One Direction – "Best Song Ever"
British Breakthrough Act: Bastille
British Female Solo Artist: Ellie Goulding
British Male Solo Artist: David Bowie
British Group: Arctic Monkeys
International Female Solo Artist: Lorde
International Male Solo Artist: Bruno Mars
International Group: Daft Punk
Critics' Choice Award: Sam Smith
Global Success Award: One Direction
Icon Award: Elton John

2013

Host(s): James Corden
Venue: O2 Arena
Broadcaster: ITV

MasterCard British Album of the Year: Emeli Sandé – Our Version of Events
British Single of the Year: Adele – "Skyfall"
British Breakthrough Act: Ben Howard
British Female Solo Artist: Emeli Sandé
British Male Solo Artist: Ben Howard
British Group: Mumford & Sons
British Live Act: Coldplay
British Producer of the Year: Paul Epworth
International Female Solo Artist: Lana Del Rey
International Male Solo Artist: Frank Ocean
International Group: The Black Keys
Critics' Choice: Tom Odell
Global Success: One Direction
Special Recognition: War Child

2012

Host(s): James Corden
Venue: O2 Arena
Broadcaster: ITV

MasterCard British Album of the Year: Adele – 21
British Single of the Year: One Direction – "What Makes You Beautiful"
British Breakthrough Act: Ed Sheeran
British Female Solo Artist: Adele
British Male Solo Artist: Ed Sheeran
British Group: Coldplay
British Producer of the Year: Ethan Johns
International Breakthrough Act: Lana Del Rey
International Female Solo Artist: Rihanna
International Male Solo Artist: Bruno Mars
International Group: Foo Fighters
Critics' Choice: Emeli Sandé
Outstanding Contribution to Music: Blur

2011

Host(s): James Corden
Venue: O2 Arena
Broadcaster: ITV

MasterCard British Album of the Year: Mumford & Sons – Sigh No More
British Single of the Year: Tinie Tempah – "Pass Out"
British Breakthrough Act: Tinie Tempah
British Female Solo Artist: Laura Marling
British Male Solo Artist: Plan B
British Group: Take That
British Producer of the Year: Markus Dravs
International Album: Arcade Fire- The Suburbs
International Breakthrough Act: Justin Bieber
International Female Solo Artist: Rihanna
International Male Solo Artist: CeeLo Green
International Group: Arcade Fire
Critics' Choice: Jessie J

2010

Host(s): Peter Kay
Venue: Earls Court
Broadcaster: ITV

British Album of the Year: Florence and the Machine – Lungs
British Producer of the Year: Paul Epworth
British Single of the Year: JLS – "Beat Again"
British Breakthrough Act: JLS
British Female Solo Artist: Lily Allen
British Male Solo Artist: Dizzee Rascal
British Group: Kasabian
International Album: Lady Gaga – The Fame
International Breakthrough Act: Lady Gaga
International Female Solo Artist: Lady Gaga
International Male Solo Artist: Jay Z
Critics' Choice: Ellie Goulding
Outstanding Contribution to Music: Robbie Williams
Live Performance at the Brit Awards: Spice Girls – "Wannabe" / "Who Do You Think You Are"
British Album of 30 Year: Oasis – (What's the Story) Morning Glory?

2009

Host(s): Kylie Minogue, James Corden and Mathew Horne
Venue: Earls Court
Broadcaster: ITV

British Album of the Year: Duffy – Rockferry
British Single of the Year: Girls Aloud – "The Promise"
British Breakthrough Act: Duffy
British Female Solo Artist: Duffy
British Male Solo Artist: Paul Weller
British Group: Elbow
British Live Act: Iron Maiden
British Producer of the Year: Bernard Butler
International Album: Kings of Leon – Only By The Night
International Female Solo Artist: Katy Perry
International Male Solo Artist: Kanye West
International Group: Kings of Leon
Critics' Choice: Florence and the Machine
Outstanding Contribution to Music: Pet Shop Boys

2008

Host(s): The Osbournes
Venue: Earls Court
Broadcaster: ITV

British Album of the Year: Arctic Monkeys – Favourite Worst Nightmare
British Single of the Year: Take That – "Shine"
British Breakthrough Act: Mika
British Female Solo Artist: Kate Nash
British Male Solo Artist: Mark Ronson
British Group: Arctic Monkeys
British Live Act: Take That
International Album: Foo Fighters – Echoes, Silence, Patience & Grace
International Female Solo Artist: Kylie Minogue
International Male Solo Artist: Kanye West
International Group: Foo Fighters
Critics' Choice: Adele
Outstanding Contribution to Music: Paul McCartney

2007

Host(s): Russell Brand
Venue: Earls Court
Broadcaster: ITV

British Album of the Year: Arctic Monkeys – Whatever People Say I Am, That's What I'm Not
British Single of the Year: Take That – "Patience"
British Breakthrough Act: The Fratellis
British Male Solo Artist: James Morrison
British Female Solo Artist: Amy Winehouse
British Group: Arctic Monkeys
British Live Act: Muse
International Album: The Killers – "Sam's Town"
International Breakthrough Act: Orson
International Female Solo Artist: Nelly Furtado
International Male Solo Artist: Justin Timberlake
International Group: The Killers
Outstanding Contribution to Music: Oasis

2006

Host(s): Chris Evans
Venue: Earls Court
Broadcaster: ITV

British Album of the Year: Coldplay – X&Y
British Single of the Year: Coldplay – "Speed of Sound"
British Breakthrough Act: Arctic Monkeys
British Female Solo Artist: KT Tunstall
British Male Solo Artist: James Blunt
British Group: Kaiser Chiefs
British Live Act: Kaiser Chiefs
British Rock Act: Kaiser Chiefs
British Urban Act: Lemar
Best Pop Act: James Blunt
International Album: Green Day – American Idiot
International Breakthrough Act: Jack Johnson
International Female Solo Artist: Madonna
International Male Solo Artist: Kanye West
International Group: Green Day
Outstanding Contribution to Music: Paul Weller

2005 

Host(s): Chris Evans
Venue: Earls Court
Broadcaster: ITV

British Album of the Year: Keane – Hopes and Fears
British Single of the Year: Will Young – "Your Game"
British Breakthrough Act: Keane
British Female Solo Artist: Joss Stone
British Male Solo Artist: The Streets
British Group: Franz Ferdinand
British Live Act: Muse
British Rock Act: Franz Ferdinand
British Urban Act: Joss Stone
Best Pop Act: McFly
International Album: Scissor Sisters – Scissor Sisters
International Breakthrough Act: Scissor Sisters
International Female Solo Artist: Gwen Stefani
International Male Solo Artist: Eminem
International Group: Scissor Sisters
British 25 Year Best Song Award: Robbie Williams – "Angels"
Outstanding Contribution to Music: Bob Geldof

2004 

Host(s): Cat Deeley
Venue: Earls Court
Broadcaster: ITV

British Album of the Year: The Darkness – Permission to Land
British Single of the Year: Dido – "White Flag"
British Breakthrough Act: Busted
British Female Solo Artist: Dido
British Male Solo artist: Daniel Bedingfield
British Group: The Darkness
British Dance Act: Basement Jaxx
British Rock Act: The Darkness
British Urban Act: Lemar
Best Pop Act: Busted
International Album: Justin Timberlake – Justified
International Breakthrough Act: 50 Cent
International Female Solo Artist: Beyoncé
International Male Solo Artist: Justin Timberlake
International Group: The White Stripes
Outstanding Contribution to Music: Duran Duran

2003 

Host(s): Davina McCall
Venue: Earls Court

British Album of the Year: Coldplay – A Rush of Blood to the Head
British Single of the Year: Liberty X – "Just a Little"
British Breakthrough Act: Will Young
British Female Solo Artist: Ms. Dynamite
British Male Solo Artist: Robbie Williams
British Group: Coldplay
British Dance Act: Sugababes
British Urban Act: Ms. Dynamite
Best Pop Act: Blue
International Album: Eminem – "The Eminem Show"
International Breakthrough Act: Norah Jones
International Female Solo Artist: Pink
International Male Solo Artist: Eminem
International Group: Red Hot Chili Peppers
Outstanding Contribution to Music: Tom Jones

2002 

Host(s): Frank Skinner and Zoe Ball
Venue: Earls Court

British Album of the Year: Dido – No Angel
British Single of the Year: S Club 7 – "Don't Stop Movin'"
British Video: So Solid Crew – "21 Seconds"
British Breakthrough Act: Blue
British Female Solo Artist: Dido
British Male Solo Artist: Robbie Williams
British Group: Travis
British Dance Act: Basement Jaxx
Best Pop Act: Westlife
International Album: Kylie Minogue – Fever
International Breakthrough Act: The Strokes
International Female Solo Artist: Kylie Minogue
International Male Solo Artist: Shaggy
International Group: Destiny's Child
Outstanding Contribution to Music: Sting

2001 

Host(s): Ant & Dec
Venue: Earls Court

British Album of the Year: Coldplay – Parachutes
British Single of the Year: Robbie Williams – "Rock DJ"
British Video: Robbie Williams – "Rock DJ"
British Breakthrough Act: a1
British Female Solo Artist: Sonique
British Male Solo Artist: Robbie Williams
British Group: Coldplay
British Dance Act: Fatboy Slim
Best Soundtrack/Cast Recording: American Beauty
Best Pop Act: Westlife
International Breakthrough Act: Kelis
International Female Solo Artist: Madonna
International Male Solo Artist: Eminem
International Group: U2
Outstanding Contribution to Music: U2

2000 

Host(s): Davina McCall
Venue: Earls Court

British Album of the Year: Travis – The Man Who
British Single of the Year: Robbie Williams – "She's the One"
British Video: Robbie Williams – "She's the One"
British Breakthrough Act: S Club 7
British Female Solo Artist: Beth Orton
British Male Solo Artist: Tom Jones
British Group: Travis
British Dance Act: The Chemical Brothers
Best Soundtrack/Cast Recording: Notting Hill
Best Selling Live Act: Steps
Best Pop Act: Five
International Breakthrough Act: Macy Gray
International Female Solo Artist: Macy Gray
International Male Solo Artist: Beck
International Group: TLC
Outstanding Contribution to Music: Spice Girls

1999 

Host(s): Johnny Vaughan
Venue: London Arena

British Album of the Year: Manic Street Preachers – This Is My Truth Tell Me Yours
British Single of the Year: Robbie Williams – "Angels"
British Video: Robbie Williams – "Millennium"
British Breakthrough Act: Belle & Sebastian
British Female Solo Artist: Des'ree
British Male Solo Artist: Robbie Williams
British Group: Manic Street Preachers
British Dance Act: Fatboy Slim
Best Soundtrack/Cast Recording: Titanic
International Breakthrough Act: Natalie Imbruglia
International Female Solo Artist: Natalie Imbruglia
International Male Solo Artist: Beck
International Group: The Corrs
Outstanding Contribution to Music: Eurythmics

1998 

Host(s): Ben Elton
Venue: London Arena

British Album of the Year: The Verve – Urban Hymns
British Single of the Year: All Saints – "Never Ever"
British Video: All Saints – "Never Ever"
British Breakthrough Act: Stereophonics
British Female Solo Artist: Shola Ama
British Male Solo Artist: Finley Quaye
British Group: The Verve
British Dance Act: The Prodigy
British Producer of the Year: The Verve, Chris Potter and Youth
Best Soundtrack/Cast Recording: The Full Monty
Best Selling British Album Act: Spice Girls (for the albums: Spice and Spiceworld)
International Breakthrough Act: Eels
International Female Solo Artist: Björk
International Male Solo Artist: Jon Bon Jovi
International Group: U2
Freddie Mercury Award: Sir Elton John
Outstanding Contribution to Music: Fleetwood Mac

1997 

Host(s): Ben Elton
Venue: Earls Court

British Album of the Year: Manic Street Preachers – Everything Must Go
British Single of the Year: Spice Girls – "Wannabe"
British Video: Spice Girls – "Say You'll Be There"
British Breakthrough Act: Kula Shaker
British Female Solo Artist: Gabrielle
British Male Solo Artist: George Michael
British Group: Manic Street Preachers
British Dance Act: The Prodigy
British Producer of the Year: John Leckie
Best Soundtrack/Cast Recording: Trainspotting
International Breakthrough Act: Robert Miles
International Female Solo Artist: Sheryl Crow
International Male Solo Artist: Beck
International Group: The Fugees
Outstanding Contribution to Music: Bee Gees

1996 

Host(s): Chris Evans
Venue: Earls Court

British Album of the Year: Oasis – (What's the Story) Morning Glory
British Single of the Year: Take That – "Back for Good"
British Video: Oasis – "Wonderwall"
British Breakthrough Act: Supergrass
British Female Solo Artist: Annie Lennox
British Male Solo Artist: Paul Weller
British Group: Oasis
British Dance Act: Massive Attack
British Producer of the Year: Brian Eno
Best Soundtrack/Cast Recording: Batman Forever
International Breakthrough Act: Alanis Morissette
International Female Solo Artist: Björk
International Male Solo Artist: Prince
International Group: Bon Jovi
Artist of a Generation: Michael Jackson
Freddie Mercury Award: The Help Album for the Charity Warchild
Outstanding Contribution to Music: David Bowie

1995 

Host(s): Chris Evans
Venue: Alexandra Palace

British Album of the Year: Blur: Parklife
British Single of the Year: Blur – "Parklife"
British Video: Blur – "Parklife"
British Breakthrough Act: Oasis
British Female Solo Artist: Eddi Reader
British Male Solo Artist: Paul Weller
British Group: Blur
British Dance Act: M People
British Producer of the Year: Nellee Hooper
Best Soundtrack/Cast Recording: Pulp Fiction
International Breakthrough Act: Lisa Loeb
International Female Solo Artist: k.d. lang
International Male Solo Artist: Prince
International Group: R.E.M.
Outstanding Contribution to Music: Elton John

1994 

Host(s): Rupaul and Elton John
Venue: Alexandra Palace

British Album of the Year: Stereo MC's – Connected
British Single of the Year: Take That – "Pray"
British Video: Take That – "Pray"
British Breakthrough Act: Gabrielle
British Female Solo Artist: Dina Carroll
British Male Solo Artist: Sting
British Group: Stereo MC's
British Dance Act: M People
British Producer of the Year: Brian Eno
Best Selling Album & Single: Meat Loaf
Best Soundtrack/Cast Recording: The Bodyguard
International Breakthrough Act: Björk
International Female Solo Artist: Björk
International Male Solo Artist: Lenny Kravitz
International Group: Crowded House
Outstanding Contribution to Music: Van Morrison

1993 

Host(s): Richard O'Brien
Venue: Alexandra Palace

British Album of the Year: Annie Lennox – Diva
British Single of the Year: Take That – "Could It Be Magic"
British Video: Shakespear's Sister – "Stay"
British Breakthrough Act: Tasmin Archer
British Female Solo Artist – Annie Lennox
British Male Solo Artist: Mick Hucknall
British Group: Simply Red
British Producer of the Year: Peter Gabriel
Best Classical Recording: Nigel Kennedy
Best Soundtrack/Cast Recording: Wayne's World
International Breakthrough Act: Nirvana
International Solo Artist (Female or Male): Prince
International Group: R.E.M.
Most Successful Live Act: U2
Outstanding Contribution to Music: Rod Stewart

1992 

Host(s): Simon Bates
Venue: Hammersmith Odeon

British Album of the Year: Seal – Seal (1991)
British Single of the Year: Queen – "These Are the Days of Our Lives"
British Video: Seal – "Killer"
British Breakthrough Act: Beverley Craven
British Female Solo Artist: Lisa Stansfield
British Male Solo Artist: Seal
British Group: The KLF and Simply Red (Joint Winners)
British Producer of the Year: Trevor Horn
Best Classical Recording: Giuseppe Verdi – (Sir Georg Solti) – "Otello"
Best Soundtrack/Cast Recording: The Commitments
International Breakthrough Act: P. M. Dawn
International Solo Artist (Female or Male): Prince
International Group: R.E.M.
Outstanding Contribution to Music: Freddie Mercury

1991 

Host(s): Simon Bates
Venue: Dominion Theatre

British Album of the Year: George Michael – Listen Without Prejudice
British Single of the Year: Depeche Mode – "Enjoy the Silence"
British Video: The Beautiful South – "A Little Time"
British Breakthrough Act: Betty Boo
British Female Solo Artist: Lisa Stansfield
British Male Solo Artist: Elton John
British Group: The Cure
British Producer of the Year: Chris Thomas
Best Classical Recording: José Carreras, Plácido Domingo, Luciano Pavarotti – In Concert
Best Soundtrack/Cast Recording: Twin Peaks
International Breakthrough Act: MC Hammer
International Female Solo Artist: Sinéad O'Connor
International Male Solo Artist: Michael Hutchence
International Group: INXS
Outstanding Contribution to Music: Status Quo

1990 

Host(s): Cathy McGowan
Venue: Dominion Theatre

British Album of the Year: Fine Young Cannibals – The Raw and the Cooked
British Single of the Year: Phil Collins – "Another Day in Paradise"
British Video: The Cure – "Lullaby"
British Breakthrough Act: Lisa Stansfield
British Female Solo Artist: Annie Lennox
British Male Solo Artist: Phil Collins
British Group: Fine Young Cannibals
British Producer of the Year: Dave Stewart
Best Classical Recording: Simon Rattle – George Gershwin's – "Porgy and Bess"
Best Soundtrack/Cast Recording: Batman
International Breakthrough Act: Neneh Cherry
International Solo Artist (Female or Male): Neneh Cherry
International Group: U2
Outstanding Contribution to Music: Queen

1989 

Host(s): Mick Fleetwood and Samantha Fox
Venue: Royal Albert Hall

British Album of the Year: Fairground Attraction – The First of a Million Kisses
British Single of the Year: Fairground Attraction – "Perfect"
British Video: Michael Jackson – "Smooth Criminal"
British Breakthrough Act: Bros
British Female Solo Artist: Annie Lennox
British Male Solo Artist: Phil Collins
British Group: Erasure
Best Classical Recording: George Frideric Handel's – Messiah
Best Soundtrack/Cast Recording: Buster
International Breakthrough Act: Tracy Chapman
International Female Solo Artist: Tracy Chapman
International Male Solo Artist: Michael Jackson
International Group: U2
Outstanding Contribution to Music: Cliff Richard

1988 

Host(s): Noel Edmonds
Venue: Royal Albert Hall

British Album of the Year: Sting – ...Nothing Like the Sun
British Single of the Year: Rick Astley – "Never Gonna Give You Up"
British Video: New Order – "True Faith"
British Breakthrough Act: Wet Wet Wet
British Female Solo Artist: Alison Moyet
British Male Solo Artist: George Michael
British Group: Pet Shop Boys
British Producer of the Year: Stock Aitken Waterman
Best Classical Recording: Ralph Vaughan Williams – Symphony No. 5
Best Soundtrack/Cast Recording: The Phantom of the Opera
International Breakthrough Act: Terence Trent D'Arby
International Solo Artist (Female or Male): Michael Jackson
International Group: U2
Outstanding Contribution to Music: The Who

1987 

Host(s): Jonathan King
Venue: Grosvenor Hotel

British Album of the Year: Dire Straits – Brothers in Arms
British Single of the Year: Pet Shop Boys – "West End Girls"
British Video: Peter Gabriel – "Sledgehammer"
British Breakthrough Act: The Housemartins
British Female Solo Artist: Kate Bush
British Male Solo Artist: Peter Gabriel
British Group: Five Star
British Producer of the Year: Dave Stewart
Best Classical Recording: Julian Lloyd Webber/Royal Philharmonic Orchestra  Edward Elgar Cello Concerto
Best Soundtrack/Cast Recording: Top Gun
International Solo Artist (Female or Male): – Paul Simon
International Group: The Bangles
Outstanding Contribution to Music: Eric Clapton

1986 

Host(s): Noel Edmonds
Venue: Grosvenor Hotel

British Album of the Year: Phil Collins – No Jacket Required
British Single of the Year: Tears for Fears – "Everybody Wants to Rule the World"
British Video of the Year: Paul Young – "Everytime You Go Away"
British Producer of the Year: Dave Stewart
British Breakthrough Act: Go West
British Female Solo Artist: Annie Lennox
British Male Solo Artist: Phil Collins
British Group: Dire Straits
International Solo Artist (Female or Male): Bruce Springsteen
International Group: Huey Lewis and the News
Classical Recording: Nigel Kennedy
Outstanding Contribution to Music: Wham! and Elton John (Joint Winners)

1985 

Host(s): Noel Edmonds
Venue: Grosvenor Hotel

British Album of the Year: Sade – Diamond Life
British Single of the Year: Frankie Goes to Hollywood – "Relax"
British Video: Duran Duran – "The Wild Boys"
British Breakthrough Act: Frankie Goes to Hollywood
British Male Solo Artist: Paul Young
British Female Solo Artist: Alison Moyet
British Group: Wham!
British Producer of the Year: Trevor Horn
British Comedy Recording: Neil (also known as Nigel Planer) – "Hole in My Shoe"
Best Classical Recording: Antonio Vivaldi's – The Four Seasons
Best Soundtrack/Cast Recording: Purple Rain
International Artist (Group or Solo): Prince & The Revolution
Outstanding Contribution to Music: The Police
Special Award: Bob Geldof and Midge Ure

1984 

Host(s): Tim Rice
Venue: Grosvenor Hotel

British Breakthrough Act: Paul Young
British Female Solo Artist: Annie Lennox
British Male Solo Artist: David Bowie
British Group: Culture Club
British Producer of the Year: Steve Levine
Best Classical Recording: Kiri Te Kanawa – Songs of the Auvergne
Best Selling Album: Michael Jackson – Thriller
Best Selling Single: Culture Club – "Karma Chameleon"
International Artist (Group or Solo): Michael Jackson
Outstanding Contribution to Music: George Martin
Sony Trophy Award for Technical Excellence: Spandau Ballet

1983 

Host(s): Tim Rice
Venue: Grosvenor Hotel

British Breakthrough Act: Yazoo
British Male Solo Artist: Paul McCartney
British Female Solo Artist: Kim Wilde
British Group: Dire Straits
British Producer of the Year: Trevor Horn
British Classical Recording: John Williams – Portrait Of John Williams
International Artist (Group or Solo): Kid Creole and the Coconuts
Best Selling Album: Barbra Streisand – Memories
Best Selling Single: Dexys Midnight Runners – "Come On Eileen"
Special Award: Chris Wright
Sony Trophy Award for Technical Excellence: Paul McCartney
Lifetime Achievement Award: Pete Townshend
Outstanding Contribution to Music: The Beatles

1982 

Host(s): David Jacobs
Venue: Grosvenor Hotel

British Album of the Year: Adam and the Ants – Kings of the Wild Frontier
British Single of the Year: Soft Cell – "Tainted Love"
British Breakthrough Act: The Human League
British Female Solo Artist: Randy Crawford
British Male Solo Artist: Cliff Richard
British Group: The Police
British Producer of the Year: Martin Rushent
Best Classical Recording: Gustav Mahler's – Symphony No. 10
Outstanding Contribution to Music: John Lennon

1977 

Host(s): Michael Aspel
Venue: Wembley Conference Centre

n.b. these awards were to mark the Queen's Silver Jubilee and were for the previous 25 years of her reign.

British Album of the Year: The Beatles – Sgt. Pepper's Lonely Hearts Club Band
British Single of the Year: Queen – "Bohemian Rhapsody" & Procol Harum – "A Whiter Shade of Pale" (Joint Winners)
British Female Newcomer: Julie Covington
British Male Newcomer: Graham Parker
British Female Solo Artist: Shirley Bassey
British Male Solo Artist: Cliff Richard
British Group: The Beatles
British Producer of the Year: George Martin
British Non-Musical Recording: Richard Burton and Cast of Under Milk Wood
Best Classical Soloist Album: Jacqueline du Pré – Edward Elgar Cello Concerto
Best Orchestral Album: Benjamin Britten – War Requiem
International Album: Simon & Garfunkel – Bridge over Troubled Water
Outstanding Contribution to Music: L.G. Wood and The Beatles (Joint Winners)

References

Brit Awards
Brit Awards ceremonies
Ceremonies in the United Kingdom
Brit